Gary Dunham (born March 25, 1951) is an American Contemporary Christian recording artist. He has played professionally since the late 1960s. In addition to his two solo albums, he has written songs for many other artists including Kathy Troccoli, Sandi Patty, and the Gaither Vocal Band.  His musical versatility has enabled him to traverse several musical genres including gospel, country, and rock.

Gary is originally from St. Joseph, Missouri. Although he is a talented guitarist and a practitioner of several different instruments, he is most known as a piano and keyboard virtuoso.  A formally trained musician, Gary began his musical endeavors early, writing music and performing live as a young teen.  Gary moved to California in 1973 and toured with the final incarnation of the L.A. rock band Blues Image (of "Ride, Captain, Ride" fame).  After several years, the rigors of life on the road and the constant stress of touring resulted in problems in his personal life.  However, it was this very life crises that brought Gary to a spiritual awakening and with it the realization of his great need for a personal relationship with Jesus Christ.  This awakening was so powerful that it not only came to encompass his private life but his musical career as well.  He dedicated himself completely to God's call and became a "music evangelist."  For a couple of years, he performed as an indie artist.

Gary moved to Nashville, Tennessee in 1979 to begin in earnest his Christian music ministry.  He soon signed with NewPax Records and eventually recorded two top albums: "Gary Dunham" in 1980 and "The Pearl" in 1982.  From these albums came his two most popular songs, the CCM hit singles, "Happy Family" and "The Pearl," both of whom he co-wrote with Rosemary Dunham-Yocam.

From 1978 until 1982, Gary traveled and primarily performed as a solo artist, even playing on the college and small club circuits.  In 1983, renowned Christian artist Don Francisco invited Gary to join him on tour.  For several years, the duo performed and recorded together with great success. However, during the 1990s, Gary greatly cut back on his touring. Gary now resides again in his hometown of St. Joseph (MO) and continues to write and perform music.

Discography 
1980 Gary Dunham
1982 The Pearl

External links 
Christian Music Archive

1951 births
Living people
American male songwriters
Guitarists from Missouri
American male guitarists
20th-century American guitarists
20th-century American male musicians